Maree Bowden (née Grubb; born 20 November 1979 in Clyde, New Zealand) is a New Zealand international netball player. Bowden played with the Canterbury Flames in the National Bank Cup from 1999 to 2007. She continued with the Canterbury franchise, which became the Canterbury Tactix, when the ANZ Championship began in 2008. With the retirement of long-standing Canterbury captain Julie Seymour after the 2009 season, in 2010 Bowden was given the captaincy role of the Tactix.

Bowden made the New Zealand national team in 2006, and debuted the following year against Jamaica. That year she was selected in the Silver Ferns team for the 2007 Netball World Championships in Auckland, in which New Zealand came second behind Australia. She withdrew from the Silver Ferns in 2010. However, Bowden was selected as the captain of the 2010 FastNet team, which came first at the 2010 World Netball Series in Liverpool.

References

External links 
 2010 ANZ Championship profile

1979 births
Living people
New Zealand netball players
New Zealand international netball players
Mainland Tactix players
ANZ Championship players
2007 World Netball Championships players
People educated at St Kevin's College, Oamaru
Canterbury Flames players
New Zealand international Fast5 players